The 1991 Major League Baseball postseason was the playoff tournament of Major League Baseball for the 1991 season. The winners of each division advance to the postseason and face each other in a League Championship Series to determine the pennant winners that face each other in the World Series. 

In the American League, the Minnesota Twins returned to the postseason for the second time in five years, and the Toronto Blue Jays returned for the third time in the past seven years. 

In the National League, the Pittsburgh Pirates made their second consecutive appearance, and the Atlanta Braves made their first postseason appearance since 1982. This marked the first of fourteen consecutive postseason appearances for the Braves franchise from 1991 to 2005. 

This was the first postseason since 1980 to not feature a team from California.

The playoffs began on October 8, 1991, and concluded on October 27, 1991, with the Twins defeating the Braves in seven games in the 1991 World Series. It was the Twins' second title in Minnesota and their third overall.

Playoff seeds
The following teams qualified for the postseason:

American League
 Toronto Blue Jays - 91–71, Clinched AL East
 Minnesota Twins - 95–67, Clinched AL West

National League
 Pittsburgh Pirates - 98–64, Clinched NL East
 Atlanta Braves - 94–68, Clinched NL West

Playoff bracket

American League Championship Series

Minnesota Twins vs. Toronto Blue Jays

The Twins defeated the Blue Jays in five games to return to the World Series for the second time in five years.

In Game 1, the Twins' bullpen held off a rally by the Blue Jays to win 5-4. Juan Guzmán and Duane Ward helped the Blue Jays prevail by a 5-2 score in Game 2 to even the series headed home to Toronto. The Twins took Game 3 in extra innings thanks to a solo home run from Mike Pagliarulo in the top of the tenth. Jack Morris and Steve Bedrosian shut down the Blue Jays' offense in Game 4 as the Twins won in a blowout, 9-3, to take a 3-1 series lead. Game 5 was an offensive duel which was won by the Twins, as they overcame a 5-2 Blue Jays lead with six unanswered runs to clinch the pennant.

As of 2022, this is the last time that the Twins won the American League Pennant, as well as the last time that a team from the Minneapolis-St. Paul metropolitan area won a league or conference championship of the four major North American sports leagues.

The Blue Jays returned to the ALCS the next year, defeating the Oakland Athletics in six games en route to their first World Series title.

National League Championship Series

Pittsburgh Pirates vs. Atlanta Braves

This was the first postseason meeting between the Braves and Pirates. It was also the first of eight consecutive appearances in the NLCS for the Braves, which ended in 1999. The Braves defeated the Pirates in seven games to return to the World Series for the first time since 1958, when the team was still based in Milwaukee.

Doug Drabek out-dueled Tom Glavine as the Pirates took Game 1 by a 5-1 score. The Braves evened the series in Game 2 with a 1-0 shutout victory, as Steve Avery out-dueled Zane Smith. When the series shifted to Atlanta, John Smoltz pitched six solid innings as the Braves blew out the Pirates, 10-3, to take a 2-1 series lead. The Pirates evened the series in an extra-inning Game 4 as Mike LaValliere scored the winning run with an RBI single. In Game 5, Smith out-dueled Glavine as the Pirates won 1-0 to take a 3-2 series lead headed back to Pittsburgh, now one win away from their first NL pennant in 12 years. Game 6 was another pitchers' duel, which featured Avery and Drabek. It would be won by the former as the Braves won 1-0 to force a seventh game. Smoltz pitched a complete game shutout in Game 7 as the Braves won 4-0 to clinch the pennant.

The Braves and Pirates would meet again in the NLCS the next year, with the Braves coming out on top yet again in an even closer 7-game series. This was the first pennant won by the Braves during the 1990s. They would win it in seven games over the Pirates again the next year, as well as in 1995, 1996, and 1999.

1991 World Series

Minnesota Twins (AL) vs. Atlanta Braves (NL) 

This was the first World Series ever played in the Deep South. It was also the first World Series since 1987 to not feature a team from California, and where neither team won a road game. In what is considered to be one of the greatest World Series ever played, the Twins defeated the Braves in seven games to win their second title in the past five years. This series was notable for several grueling contests, with five of its games decided by one run (three of which in extra innings; including the third game, a 12-inning marathon that saw Twins manager Tom Kelly run out of hitters). Game 7 was a scoreless tie (0–0) through all nine innings of regulation; Minnesota won 1–0 in the 10th inning, with starting pitcher Jack Morris pitching a complete game.

This was the first of five World Series appearances for the Braves during the 1990s, they would return to the World Series the following year, only to lose to the Toronto Blue Jays in six games. They also appeared in the World Series in 1995 (Defeated Cleveland 4–2), 1996 (lost to the Yankees 4–2), and 1999 (lost to the Yankees 4–0). To date, this is the last World Series appearance and title for the Twins, and their last postseason appearance until 2002. As of 2022, this is the last championship of the four major North American sports leagues won by a team from the Minneapolis-St. Paul metropolitan area.

References

External links
 League Baseball Standings & Expanded Standings - 1991

 
Major League Baseball postseason